Jessica Shepard (born September 11, 1996) is an American professional basketball player for the Minnesota Lynx of the Women's National Basketball Association (WNBA). Shepard began her college career at Nebraska, playing there for two seasons before transferring to Notre Dame to complete her career.

Family and early years
A Fremont, Nebraska native, Shepard is the daughter of Mark and Kim Shepard. She has four sisters and one older brother. won a state title while attending Lincoln Southeast High School in 2013.

WNBA

Minnesota Lynx (2019–present)
Shepard was selected 16th overall in the 2nd round of the 2019 WNBA Draft. Shepard appeared in 5 games of the 2019 season, and averaged 4.6 ppg. On June 8, 2019, in a game against the Los Angeles Sparks, it was determined Shepard had torn her ACL, effectively ending her rookie season.

Shepard missed the 2020 season as she continued to recovery from her ACL injury that she sustained in 2019.

WNBA career statistics

Regular season

|-
| style="text-align:left;"| 2019
| style="text-align:left;"| Minnesota
| 6 || 0 || 18.7 || .379 || .143 || .750 || 5.7 || 3.5 || 0.3 || 0.2 || 2.5 || 4.8
|-
| style="text-align:left;"| 2021
| style="text-align:left;"| Minnesota
| 22 || 0 || 10.5 || .364 || .083 || .750 || 3.2 || 1.7 || 0.1 || 0.2 || 0.8 || 2.0
|-
| style="text-align:left;"| 2022
| style="text-align:left;"| Minnesota
| 36 || 22 || 26.1 || .500 || .250 || .734 || 7.4 || 3.0 || 0.4 || 0.3 || 1.7 || 8.1
|- 
| style="text-align:left;"| Career
| style="text-align:left;"| 3 years, 1 team
| 64 || 22 || 20.1 || .467 || .186 || .737 || 5.8 || 2.6 || 0.3 || 0.3 || 1.5 || 5.7
|}

Nebraska and Notre Dame statistics
Source

Notes

External links
WNBA Player Profile

1996 births
Living people
All-American college women's basketball players
American women's basketball players
Basketball players from Nebraska
Forwards (basketball)
Minnesota Lynx draft picks
Minnesota Lynx players
Nebraska Cornhuskers women's basketball players
Notre Dame Fighting Irish women's basketball players
People from Fremont, Nebraska